Ermurat Seitkazyuly Bapi (Ermurat Seitkazyuly Bapi; born 7 March 1959) is a Kazakh politician, journalist who was the Chairman of Nationwide Social Democratic Party (JSDP) from 26 April to 6 September 2019. He is the editor of the independent newspaper Tasjargan (Zhuma-Times and Aina Plus).

Biography

Early life and education 
Bapi was born in the village of Qarabulaq in East Kazakhstan Region. In 1976, he was a correspondent of the Zaisan Regional newspaper. From 1977 to 1980, he served in the Soviet Navy of Kamchatka Submarine Flotilla of the Red Banner Pacific Fleet, where he was a petty officer in reserve. In 1985, Bapi graduated from the Al-Farabi Kazakh National University with a degree in journalism.

Career 
After graduating, Bapi worked as correspondent, senior correspondent, head of the Department of the East Kazakhstan regional newspaper Kommunism tui (Didar), correspondent, senior correspondent of the newspaper Socialist Kazakhstan and Egemen Kazakhstan. From 1992 to 1995, he was the deputy general director of Kazakh Radio, head of the editorial office of Dustom and commercial programs Taikazan. From 1995, Bapi worked as the deputy head of the Press Service of the Government of Kazakhstan until he became the advisor to the President of the Union of Industrialists and Entrepreneurs of Kazakhstan Akezhan Kazhegeldin in 1998. He then was the head of the publishing project DAT and the chief editor of the newspaper SolDAT.

In April 2009, Bapi was jailed for 5 days after not paying large amounts of compensation to MP Romin Madinov for allegedly libeling him. Bapi accused the charges of being politically motivated.

Bapi served as member of the Central Council of the movement For a Just Kazakhstan. He ran in the 2016 Kazakh legislative election in the Nationwide Social Democratic Party (JSDP) party list which won no seats in the Mazhilis.

On 22 April 2019, the JSDP nominated Bapi as candidate for the 2019 presidential elections. However on 26 April, after Zharmakhan Tuyakbay stepped down from the post of the Chairman of JSDP, Bapi was unanimously chosen by the party's delegates to succeed Tuyakbay's role. It was also announced that the JSDP would refuse to participate in the election with Bapi calling for boycott. On 6 September 2019, at the 15th Extraordinary Congress of the JSDP, the party delegates expressed a vote of no confidence in Bapi, and as a result, he was removed the post as the party's chairman. The reason for removal was due to disapproval by the party members such as his trip to Paris in May, where Bapi met former PM Akezhan Kazhegeldin and the former Äkim of Atyrau Region Bergei Rysqaliev, who have been living in exile and convicted at home on charges in corruption while others saw no Bapi's ability to attract new members to the party. He was replaced by Ashat Raqymjanov as the party's new chairman. Former Chairman Tuyakbay called the party's move as "dirty and dastardly coup." On 8 October 2019, Bapi claimed that Rysqaliev was a "rightful owner" of the party.

References 

1959 births
Living people
People from East Kazakhstan Region
Al-Farabi Kazakh National University alumni
Nationwide Social Democratic Party politicians
Kazakhstani journalists
Kazakhstani politicians